= UEFA Champions League 2008 =

UEFA Champions League 2008 may refer to:

- UEFA Champions League 2007-08
- UEFA Champions League 2008-09
